Aiseki may refer to:
Table sharing, common custom in crowded restaurants in Japan and elsewhere
Sō Aiseki (僧愛石), late Edo period landscape painter in Japan
Track 2 on Miyuki Nakajima's 2001 album Lullaby for the Soul
2010 episode of Japanese cartoon series Queen's Blade